Partygoing is the third studio album by American indie pop band Future Bible Heroes. Future Bible Heroes member and lead lyricist Stephin Merritt was inspired by the 1981 B-52's album Party Mix! to create Partygoing, conceived as "a party album that only just happens to be largely about drunk suicide, aging, death, loss, and despair."

Track listing
All songs written by Stephin Merritt and Christopher Ewen.

"A Drink Is Just the Thing" – 1:26
"Sadder Than the Moon" – 3:44
"Let's Go to Sleep (And Never Come Back)" – 2:48
"Satan, Your Way Is a Hard One" – 2:30
"A New Kind of Town" – 1:47
"All I Care About Is You" – 3:22
"Living, Loving, Partygoing" – 3:22
"Keep Your Children in a Coma" – 2:19
"How Very Strange" – 2:47
"Love Is a Luxury I Can No Longer Afford" – 2:19
"Digging My Own Grave" – 3:05
"Drink Nothing But Champagne" – 2:06
"When Evening Falls on Tinseltown" – 2:36

Personnel
Credits adapted from AllMusic.

Future Bible Heroes
Christopher Ewen – composition, engineering, instrumentation
Claudia Gonson – vocals
Stephin Merritt – composition, instrumentation, mixing, vocals

Additional personnel
 Michael English – design
 Jeff Lipton – mastering
 Charles Newman – engineer, mixing
 Maria Rice – assistant mastering engineer

References

2013 albums
Future Bible Heroes albums
Merge Records albums